Victor Felix Janowicz (February 26, 1930 – February 27, 1996) was an American football halfback in the National Football League (NFL) for the Washington Redskins.  He played college football at Ohio State University and was drafted in the seventh round of the 1952 NFL Draft.  Janowicz was inducted into the College Football Hall of Fame in 1976.

Early life
Janowicz was born and raised in Elyria, Ohio as son of Polish immigrants. He went to Holy Cross Elementary School and graduated from Elyria High School.  The stretch of Seventh Street which runs along the south side of Elyria High is named Vic Janowicz Drive in his honor.  In addition, a life-size painting of Janowicz hangs in the lobby of the school.

College career
Janowicz played college football at Ohio State University.  A tailback in the single wing, he won the Heisman Trophy in 1950 as a junior.  Woody Hayes, who coached Janowicz's senior year, said of him, "He was not only a great runner, but also passed, was a placekicker and punter, played safety on defense and was an outstanding blocker.  Janowicz epitomized the 'triple-threat' football player."

Professional career
After college, Janowicz passed up offers to play professional football in order to pursue a baseball career.  He reached the major leagues with the Pittsburgh Pirates, but hit only .214 over two seasons as a bench player.  He returned to football late in the 1954 season with the Washington Redskins, and was their starting halfback in 1955.  During training camp in 1956, he suffered a serious brain injury in an automobile accident that left him partially paralyzed and ended his athletic career.

Janowicz eventually made a full recovery and became a broadcaster of Buckeye football games.  Later he worked as an account executive at a Columbus manufacturing firm and, from 1986, as an administrative assistant to the state auditor.

He died in Columbus, Ohio, of cancer in 1996.

References

External links
 
 
 
 

1930 births
1996 deaths
American football halfbacks
Baseball catchers
Ohio State Buckeyes baseball players
Ohio State Buckeyes football players
Pittsburgh Pirates players
Washington Redskins players
All-American college football players
College Football Hall of Fame inductees
Heisman Trophy winners
People from Elyria, Ohio
Players of American football from Ohio
Baseball players from Ohio
American people of Polish descent
Deaths from cancer in Ohio